Nick Collins (born 1975) is a British academic and computer music composer. From 2006–2013 he lived in Brighton, UK, and ran the music informatics degrees at the University of Sussex. In 2013 he became Reader at the University of Durham.

He is an experienced pianist and laptopist, and active in both instrumental and electronic music composition. He has toured extensively with the audiovisual duo 'klipp av' and as a solo musician.

Alex McLean of Slub and Nick Collins are the inventors of the Algorave.

Books
 Collins, Nick (2009). Introduction to Computer Music. Chichester: Wiley 
 Collins, Nick and d'Escrivan, Julio (eds.) (2007). The Cambridge Companion to Electronic Music. Cambridge: Cambridge University Press. 
 Collins, Nick; Schedel. Margaret and Wilson, Scott (2013). Electronic Music. Cambridge: Cambridge University Press.

References

External links
 Official site
 University profile

21st-century classical composers
20th-century classical composers
British classical composers
British male classical composers
Living people
1975 births
Place of birth missing (living people)
Algorave
20th-century British composers
21st-century British composers
20th-century British male musicians
21st-century British male musicians
Academics of Durham University